John Carroll Delaney (April 22, 1848 – April 4, 1915) was a soldier who fought in the American Civil War. Delaney received the United States' highest award for bravery during combat, the Medal of Honor, for his actions during the Battle of Hatcher's Run in Virginia on 6 February 1865. He was honored with the award on 29 August 1894.

Biography
Delaney was born in Co Galway, Ireland on 22 April 1848. He joined the Army in March 1862. He was commissioned as a 2nd Lieutenant in May 1865, and mustered out with his regiment in July.  Delaney died on 4 April 1915 and his remains are interred at Arlington National Cemetery.

Medal of Honor citation

See also

List of American Civil War Medal of Honor recipients: A–F

References

1848 births
1915 deaths
People of Pennsylvania in the American Civil War
Union Army officers
United States Army Medal of Honor recipients
American Civil War recipients of the Medal of Honor